Baron  was a commander in the Imperial Japanese Navy during World War II, who was promoted posthumously to vice admiral after being killed in action in combat off Saipan.

Life and military career
Born in the Kōjimachi district of Tokyo, Ijuin was the son of Fleet Admiral Baron Ijuin Gorō. He was a graduate of the 43rd class of the Imperial Japanese Naval Academy in 1915. However, his academic record was not outstanding, as he was 92nd in a class of 96. In 1916, Iwate made a cruise to Hong Kong, Singapore, Fremantle, Sydney, Melbourne, Wellington, Auckland, Jaluit Atoll, Ponape and Truk. On his return to Japan in October, Ijuin was reassigned to the cruiser  and then, as an ensign, to the cruiser  in December.

In 1921, on the death of his father, he became a baron (danshaku) under the kazoku peerage system. Later the same year he was promoted to lieutenant. He was assigned to the cruiser  on a cruise in 1926: (Shanghai, Hong Kong, Singapore, Colombo, Aden, Port Said, Constantinople, Athens, Naples, Toulon, Marseilles, Barcelona, Malta, Alexandria, Djibouti, Mombasa, Columbo,  Batavia and Manila). After his return, Ijuin was promoted to lieutenant commander.

Ijiun served as captain of several destroyers in the early 1930s, and was also appointed as an aide-de-camp to Fleet Admiral Prince Fushimi Hiroyasu in 1932. At the end of December 1942, he was given command of the Kongō.

Ijuin saw no direct combat during the early months of World War II.  However, on his promotion to rear admiral on 1 November 1943, he commanded DESRON-3, based at Rabaul, New Britain during the Solomon Islands campaign. He was the main Japanese commander at the minor Battle off Horaniu and larger Naval Battle of Vella Lavella, during which time he successfully evacuated the 600 man Japanese garrison from the island of Vella Lavella, while repulsing attacks by American naval forces under Admiral Frank R. Walker on 6–7 October 1943.  Leading screening forces from the cruiser  during the Battle of Empress Augusta Bay on 2 November 1943, Ijuin survived the sinking of Sendai and was later rescued, along with a few other survivors, by submarine .

Ijuin was killed when his flagship, the patrol boat Iki, was torpedoed and sunk on 24 May 1944 north of Saipan.  He was posthumously promoted to vice admiral.

References

Books

External links
 Battle of Vella Lavella: October 6-7, 1943 by Vincent P. O'Hara

Notes 

1893 births
1944 deaths
People from Tokyo
Battle of Midway
Imperial Japanese Navy admirals
Japanese admirals of World War II
Japanese military personnel killed in World War II
Kazoku